Vladimir Alexandrovich Plugin (30 July 1937 – 6 December 2003) was a Russian historian and art historian, a university professor. He worked in the fields of the history of Russia, source criticism, art history, social and political history, war history, history of the army and navy. He specialized in Old Russian Chronicles, Russian icons (specifically Andrei Rublev's). He penned Rublev's biography titled The Master of the Holy Trinity: Andrei Rublev's Works and Days.

Plugin studied at the Moscow State University and graduated from the Faculty of History, where he studied under Viktor Lazarev and Mikhail Belyavsky. He taught at the Moscow State University since 1968.

Works

 Eschatology as a Subject in the Old Church Slavonic Social Thought, 1971
 The Worldview of Andrei Rublev, 1974
 Sergius of Radonezh — Dmitry Donskoy — Andrei Rublev, 1989
 Alekhan, or a Person with a Scar: A Biography of Alexei Orlov-Chesmensky, 1996
 The Master of the Holy Trinity: Andrei Rublev's Works and Days, 2001
 The History of Russian and Soviet Art, 1989

References 

1937 births
2003 deaths
Soviet art historians
Soviet male writers
20th-century Russian male writers
Moscow State University alumni
Academic staff of Moscow State University
Russian art historians